"All the Time" is a song that has been recorded by two country music singers. The first version, by Kitty Wells, peaked at #18 on the country music charts in 1959. It was the b-side to her single "Mommy for a Day," which peaked at #5.

Eight years later, Jack Greene covered the song, taking his version to Number One on the same chart. The song's B-side, "Wanting You but Never Having You," peaked at #63.

Chart performance

Kitty Wells

Jack Greene

Cover version
Patti Page included the song on her album Today My Way (1967)

References

1959 singles
1967 singles
Kitty Wells songs
Jack Greene songs
Billboard Hot Country Songs number-one singles of the year
Songs written by Mel Tillis
1959 songs
Decca Records singles